The Lowlanders Białystok is an American football team based in Białystok, Poland. They play in the Polish Football League.

History 
The team joined to the PLFA II in 2008 PLFA season. Lowlanders won the PLFA II and was promoted to the PLFA I. In the 2009 PLFA season Lowlanders lost all games (including barrage against Kraków Tigers) and were relegated to the second league. In the 2010 PLFA season team lost the PLFA II Final and were promoted to the PLFA I.

On May 8, 2011 the Lowlanders won first game in the PLFA against Kozły Poznań 18–12. Lowlanders lost other games and were relegated.

The team made it to the semifinals of the Polish American Football League playoffs twice in 2015 and 2016. After the 2017 season, the Lowlanders left the Polish American Football League and joined the new Liga Futbolu Amerykańskiego.

Season-by-season records

See also 
 Sports in Białystok

References

External links 
 

American football teams in Poland
Sport in Białystok
American football teams established in 2006
2006 establishments in Poland